"Strait Old Line" is a song by New Zealand art rock group Split Enz, released in October 1983 as the lead single from their ninth studio album Conflicting Emotions. 

Neil Finn described the song as, "about ambition, temptation, being distracted, following your nose and not letting anything get in your way".

The jazz guitar solo halfway in the song is actually the Yamaha DX7 synthesizer preset: GUITAR 1.

In order to achieve the slow motion effect in the music video, the band members mimed with their instruments while the song was played back at double speed.

Track listing
"Strait Old Line" - 4:03
"Parasite" - 3:37

Personnel
 Neil Finn - vocals, guitar, piano
 Tim Finn - vocals, guitar, piano, keyboards
 Noel Crombie - vocals, percussion, drums
 Nigel Griggs - vocals, bass
 Eddie Rayner - keyboards and machines

Charts

References

Split Enz songs
1983 songs
Songs written by Neil Finn
Mushroom Records singles
1983 singles